Jacob Johan Hastfer (11 December 1647 Tallinn – 24 December 1695 Riga) was a Swedish officer and governor of the Livonia province between 1687 and 1695.

References
 

1647 births
1695 deaths
Politicians from Tallinn
Baltic-German people
Swedish nobility
Field marshals of Sweden
17th-century Swedish military personnel
People from Livonia
17th-century Swedish politicians